Adair may refer to:

People
 Adair (name), a surname and given name
 Adair baronets in the Baronetage of the UK

Places
 Adare Manor, a manor house in Adare, County Limerick, Ireland
 Bahia Adair or Adair Bay, a bay in the municipality of San Luis Río Colorado, Sonora
 Magh Adhair, archaeological site located near the village of Quin, County Clare, Ireland

United States
 Adair, Illinois, an unincorporated census-designated place
 Adair, Iowa, a city
 Adair, an unincorporated community in Casco Township, St. Clair County, Michigan
 Adair, Oklahoma, a town
 Adair Township, Camden County, Missouri
 Adair Village, Oregon, a city
 Adair County (disambiguation)
 Adair Lake, a lake in California
 Adair Mansion, a house and subdivision in Atlanta, Georgia
 Adair Vineyards, a vineyard on the historic Thaddeus Hait Farm in Plattekill, New York
 Adair Park, Adair County, Oklahoma
 Adair Air Force Station, a closed US Air Force station near Corvallis, Oregon
 Camp Adair, Corvallis, Oregon, a US Army training facility from 1942 to 1946
 Fort Adair, a late 18th-century stockade fortification and supply depot north of Knoxville, Tennessee
 Mount Adair, a 5,178-foot (1,578 m) double summit mountain in Alaska

Other uses
 USS Adair (APA-91), a World War II attack transport
 Adair (band), a post hardcore band from St. Louis, Missouri
 Adair v. United States, a US Supreme Court decision
 Adair sepia, a type of decorative limestone found in Ontario, Canada

See also
 "My sweet Adair", a 1915 song by Anatole Friedland and L. Wolfe Gilbert
 Adairs Covered Bridge, Perry County, Pennsylvania
 Dr. John H. Adair House, Owatonna, Minnesota
 Adair County High School (disambiguation)